Arancedo is one of eight parishes (administrative divisions) in the El Franco municipality, within the province and autonomous community of Asturias, in northern Spain. 

The population is 227 (INE 2007).

Villages and hamlets
 La Andina
 Lebredo
 As Barrosas
 As Casuas
 Gudín
 Pumarios
 Arancedo de Arriba
 Caborcos
 El Pozón
 San Cibrán
 A Casia
 El Llombo
 Follaranca

Parishes in El Franco